Minato, Tokyo held a mayoral election on June 8, 2008. Incumbent mayor Masaaki Takei, supported by all major parties except the Japanese Communist Party, was re-elected with a clear majority. Polling turnout was low with only about 25% of the electorate voting.

Results

References 
 Results from JanJan 

Minato, Tokyo
2008 elections in Japan
Mayoral elections in Japan
June 2008 events in Japan
2008 in Tokyo